La querida del Centauro (Lit: The Dear of the Centaur / English: Centauro's Woman), is a Spanish-language telenovela produced by Teleset and Sony Pictures Television for Telemundo and distributed by Telemundo Internacional, based on an original idea of Lina Uribe and Dario Vanegas. The series follows the life of El Centauro and his ambition to have Yolanda as his wife.

The series features a large ensemble cast, including Humberto Zurita, Ludwika Paleta, Michel Brown, Alexandra de la Mora, Irene Azuela and Sandra Echeverría as starring cast.

Synopsis

Season 1 (2016) 
The first season chronicles the life of Yolanda, an attractive and intelligent prisoner, that becomes the mistress of one of the most important drug traffickers of Mexico, Benedictino García, alias "El Centauro". This relationship, which inside the prison will give much power to Yolanda, will end up becoming her worst nightmare when she manages to be released thanks to Gerardo, a shrewd detective whose last years have been dedicated to the fight against drug trafficking. With El Centauro in hiding, Gerardo decides to use Yolanda as bait in an operation that will take them to the hiding place of El Centauro.

Season 2 (2017) 

The second season tells the story of the Centauro revenge against Yolanda, his former lover and Gerardo, the detective who sought to bring him to justice. After running away from the authorities for two years, tired of being constantly harassed by the police and the bloody war between his cartel and his rivals, Centauro faked his death along with his second biological son. In this way he will be able to rebuild his empire without the persecution of the police and, moreover, will allow him to execute his plan of revenge towards Yolanda. Listening to the news of the alleged deaths, Yolanda and her daughter Cristina, as well as Gerardo and his adopted son, Gato, manage to return to Mexico from Canada, where they have lived under the Witness Protection Program. However, it will not be an easy return for Yolanda, since Centaurus will use all his sagacity and power to destroy her and her loved ones in their thirst for revenge.

Episodes

Cast

Starring 
 Humberto Zurita as Benedictino Suárez / El Centauro (seasons 1-2)
 Ludwika Paleta as Yolanda Acosta (seasons 1-2)
 Michel Brown as Gerardo Duarte (seasons 1-2)
 Alexandra de la Mora as Julia Peña (season 1)
 Irene Azuela as Tania Muñoz (season 1)
 Sandra Echeverría as Ana Velazco (season 2)

Also starring 
 Andrea Martí as Bibiana Taborda (season 1)
 Ricardo Polanco as Rafael Bianchini (seasons 1-2)
 Enoc Leaño as Paulino Atencio / El Cirujano (season 1)
 Carmen Delgado as Dominga (season 1)
 Pablo Abitia as Vicente Garrido (seasons 1-2)
 Ignacio Guadalupe as Comisario Manuel Salgado (season 1)
 Carmen Madrid as Mariela Acosta (season 1)
 Héctor Holten as Otoniel Morillo (season 1)
 Michel Chauvet as Emilio Cobos
 Arantza Ruiz as Cristina Acosta (seasons 1-2)
 Blanco Tapia as Marco Aguilar (season 1)
 Cuauhtli Jiménez as Ignacio "Nacho" Atencio (season 1)
 Andrés Montiel as Félix Ávila (season 1)
 Jaime Del Aguila as Luis "Lucho" (seasons 1-2)
 Iñaki Godoy as El Gato (seasons 1-2)
 Vadhir Derbez as César Suárez (season 1)
 Mónica Dionne as Leticia Solís (season 2)
 Salvador Amaya as Isidro Gómez (season 2)
 Horacio García Rojas as Lalo López (season 2)
 Tizoc Arroyo as Javier (seasons 1-2)
 Alejandro Caso as Julián Lemus (season 2)
 Óscar Toledano as Nicolás Bayón (season 2)
 Raúl Villegas as Miguel Fernández (season 2)
 José Ramón Berganza as Román Luna (season 2)

Recurring 
 José Sedek as Diego (season 1)
 Evelin Cedeño as Mariana Tapia (season 2)
 Albi De Abreu as El Loco (season 2)
 Roberto Tello as Liborio Fernández (season 2)
 Francisco Calvillo as El Dueñas (season 2)
 Jack Duarte as Alex (season 2)

Ratings

Awards and nominations

References

External links 

Telemundo telenovelas
Spanish-language American telenovelas
American telenovelas
2016 telenovelas
2016 American television series debuts
2016 Mexican television series debuts
2016 Colombian television series debuts
Works about Mexican drug cartels
Colombian telenovelas
Mexican telenovelas
Mexican LGBT-related television shows
2017 telenovelas
2017 American television series endings
2017 Mexican television series endings
2017 Colombian television series endings
Television series by Teleset
Television series by Sony Pictures Television
2010s American LGBT-related drama television series